The 1950 Maine Black Bears football team was an American football team that represented the University of Maine as a member of the Yankee Conference during the 1950 college football season. In its second and final season under head coach David M. Nelson, the team compiled a 5–1–1 record (3–1 against conference opponents).  The team played its home games at Alumni Field in Orono, Maine. Peter Pocius Jr. was the team captain.

In February 1951, coach Nelson resigned his post as Maine's head football coach to become head football coach and athletic director at the University of Delaware. Nelson was the head coach at Delaware for 15 years and was inducted into the College Football Hall of Fame in 1987.

Schedule

References

Maine
Maine Black Bears football seasons
Maine Black Bears football